Polite may refer to:

 Politeness
 Polite (magazine), an American humor magazine
 Polite architecture or "the Polite", an architectural theory and style
 Lousaka Polite (born 1981), former American football fullback